Saperda florissantensis is an extinct species of beetle in the family Cerambycidae, that existed in what is now the United States during the Miocene. It was described by Wickham in 1916.

References

†
Fossil taxa described in 1916
Extinct beetles